The white-tufted grebe (Rollandia rolland), also known as Rolland's grebe, is a species of grebe in the family Podicipedidae. Found in the southern half of South America, its natural habitat is freshwater lakes, ponds and sluggish streams.

Taxonomy and etymology
Three subspecies are recognised:
R. r. chilensis (Lesson, 1828) – South Peru and southeast Brazil southwards to Cape Horn and Tierra del Fuego.
R. r. morrisoni (Simmons, 1962) – Central Peru.
R. r. rolland (Quoy & Gaimard, 1824) – Falkland Islands.

The white-tufted grebe is also called Rolland's grebe.

Description

Adults in breeding plumage have a prominent black crest on the back of their heads. There is a large white tuft of feathers around the ear but otherwise the head, neck and back are black, with a slight greenish sheen, and the feathers of the mantle and back are narrowly bordered with brown. The underparts are a dull reddish-brown, often mottled with brown or grey. The secondary wing feathers are white, pale grey or have white tips. The eye is red, the beak black and the legs grey or olive-brown. Adults in non-breeding plumage are dark brown rather than black. The crest becomes inconspicuous, the sides of the head and throat are white and the white wing patches are retained. The neck and chest are buff, gradually paling to white on the belly. Immature birds resemble adults in non-breeding plumage but their throats and the sides of their necks have brown streaking.

Distribution and habitat
The white-tufted grebe is found in the southern part of South America. Its range includes south-eastern Brazil, Uruguay, Paraguay, Bolivia, Chile, Peru, Argentina and the Falkland Islands. It occurs as a vagrant in the South Sandwich Islands and South Georgia. Its typical habitat is lakes, marshy ponds, ditches and slow-moving streams. Birds in the southern part of the range form into flocks after the breeding season and migrate northwards up the coast. These are often seen in bays and other sheltered marine locations.

Behaviour

Breeding
The white-tufted grebe nests in colonies in beds of reeds, with individuals preferring small areas that have a high density of reeds surrounded by water and colonies, as a whole, being located in areas adjacent to water with a low density of reeds overall with small clumps that have a high density of reeds.

This grebe usually lays a clutch of one to three eggs.

Status
The white-tufted grebe has an extensive range. The IUCN lists the species as being of "least concern" as, although the population trend may be downwards, the total population is large and this means the bird does not meet the criteria for listing it in a more threatened category.

References

Rollandia (bird)
Birds described in 1824
Taxonomy articles created by Polbot